Mid Antrim was a constituency of the Northern Ireland House of Commons.

The House of Commons (Method of Voting and Redistribution of Seats) Act (Northern Ireland), 1929 introduced first-past-the-post elections for 48 single-member constituencies (including Antrim Mid).

It was a single-member division of County Antrim represented in the Parliament of Northern Ireland. Before 1929, it was part of the seven-member Antrim constituency. The constituency sent one MP to the House of Commons of Northern Ireland from 1929 until the Parliament was temporarily suspended in 1972, and then formally abolished in 1973.

In terms of the then local government areas the constituency in 1929 comprised parts of the rural districts of Ballymena, Ballymoney and Larne. The division also included the whole of the urban district of Ballymena.

Members of Parliament

Election results

 Parliament prorogued 30 March 1972 and abolished 18 July 1973

References
Parliamentary Election Results in Ireland, 1801–1922, edited by B.M. Walker (Royal Irish Academy 1978)
Who's Who of British Members of Parliament: Volume II 1886–1918, edited by M. Stenton and S. Lees (The Harvester Press 1978)
Who's Who of British Members of Parliament: Volume III 1919–1945, edited by M. Stenton and S. Lees (The Harvester Press 1979)
 Northern Ireland Parliamentary Election Results 1921–1972, compiled and edited by Sydney Elliott (Political Reference Publications 1973)

Northern Ireland Parliament constituencies established in 1929
Constituencies of the Northern Ireland Parliament
Historic constituencies in County Antrim
Northern Ireland Parliament constituencies disestablished in 1973